Frank Andrews (14 February 1886 – 22 November 1944) was an English-born Welsh rugby union, and professional rugby league footballer who played in the 1910s. He played representative level rugby union (RU) for Wales, and at club level for Pontypool RFC, as a back row, i.e. flanker or number eight, and club level rugby league (RL) for Hunslet.

Background
Frank Andrews was born in Ross-on-Wye, Herefordshire, and he died aged 58 in Leeds, West Riding of Yorkshire, England.

International honours
Frank Andrews won caps for Wales (RU) while at Pontypool RFC in 1912 against South Africa, and in 1913 against England, Scotland, and Ireland.

References

External links
Search for "Andrews" at rugbyleagueproject.org
Search for "Frank Andrews" at britishnewspaperarchive.co.uk

1886 births
1944 deaths
Footballers who switched code
Hunslet F.C. (1883) players
People from Ross-on-Wye
Pontypool RFC players
Rugby union flankers
Rugby union number eights
Wales international rugby union players
Welsh rugby league players
Welsh rugby union players